Wu Qidi (born August 1947) is a Chinese politician and engineer. She is the current president of the Shanghai Overseas Returned Scholars Association.

Education
Wu completed her undergraduate degree in radio engineering at Tsinghua University in 1970. She worked as a technician in a factory making equipment for the Yunnan Central Office for telecommunications until 1975, when she moved to Beijing to become a technician in the China Electronics Standardization Institute.

In 1978, Wu resumed her studies as a master's student Tsinghua University, researching precision instruments and working as an assistant engineer. From 1981 to 1986, Wu studied for a PhD at the Swiss Federal Institute of Technology in Zurich.

Career
From 1986 to 1989, Wu worked as a lecturer at Tongji University before becoming an assistant professor, then a professor. In 1993, she was made vice-president of Tongji University, before becoming president in 1995. During Wu's presidency, the number of students at Tongji increased from 27,000 to 56,000 and the funds available for research increased three-fold.

In 2002, Wu was an alternate member of the 16th National Congress of the Communist Party of China.

In 2003, Wu was made Vice-minister of Education, in addition to becoming a Vice-chairwoman of the All-China Women's Federation.

Honours and awards
Grand Cross of Merit of the Federal Republic of Germany (1999).
Henry Fok Scholarship Award from MOE for Young Teachers (1988)

References

Living people
1947 births
Chinese women engineers
Chinese Communist Party politicians from Zhejiang
Chinese women in politics
Educators from Wenzhou
Grand Crosses 1st class of the Order of Merit of the Federal Republic of Germany
Tsinghua University alumni
ETH Zurich alumni
People's Republic of China politicians from Zhejiang
Politicians from Wenzhou
Academic staff of Tongji University
Engineers from Zhejiang
20th-century Chinese engineers
20th-century women engineers
21st-century women engineers
All-China Women's Federation people